Nikola Nikolov (25 January 1908 – 27 April 1996) was a Bulgarian footballer. He played in 19 matches for the Bulgaria national football team from 1929 to 1938. He was also part of Bulgaria's team for their qualification matches for the 1938 FIFA World Cup.

References

External links
 

1908 births
1996 deaths
Bulgarian footballers
Bulgaria international footballers
Place of birth missing
Association footballers not categorized by position